Loren is a given name, nickname and surname which may refer to:

Given name

Men
 Loren Acton (born 1936), American physicist and astronaut
 Loren C. Ball (born 1948), amateur astronomer who has discovered more than 100 asteroids
 Loren M. Berry (1888–1980), American businessman
 Loren Bouchard (born 1970), American television writer and director
 Loren Cameron (born 1959), American photographer
 Loren Carpenter (born 1947), American computer graphics researcher and developer
 Loren Coleman (born 1947), American scientist and author
 Loren L. Coleman (born 1947), American science-fiction writer
 Loren W. Collins (1838–1912), American jurist and politician
 Loren Mazzacane Connors (born 1949), American musician
 Loren Crabtree (born 1940), American academic and chancellor
 Loren Cunningham (born 1936), American missionary organizer
 Loren Dean (born 1969), American actor
 Loren C. Dunn (1930–2001), American general authority of the LDS Church
 Loren Eiseley (1907–1977), American scientist and writer
 Loren D. Estleman (born 1952), American author
 Loren D. Everton (1915–1991), American Marine flying ace, Navy Cross recipient
 Loren Graham (born 1933), American historian of science 
 Loren Leman (born 1950), American politician
 Loren Long (born 1964), American author of children's books
 Loren Meyer (born 1972), American professional basketball player
 Loren Miller (activist), American civic reformer and libertarian activist
 Loren Miller (judge) (1903–1967), American California Superior Court judge
 Loren Mosher (1933–2004), American psychiatrist 
 Loren Murchison (1898–1979), American athlete
 Loren Nerell (born 1960), American composer, ethnomusicologist and gamelan musician
 Loren Pope (1910–2008), American writer 
 Loren Roberts (born 1955), American golfer
 Loren Schoenberg (born 1958), American musician and historian
 Loren B. Sessions (1827–1897), New York politician
 Loren Shriver (born 1944), American pilot and astronaut
 Loren A. Smith (born 1944), American federal judge on the United States Court of Federal Claims
 Loren Taylor (born 1977), American politician
 Loren Toews (born 1951), American football player
 Loren H. White (1863–1923), New York politician
 Loren Wiseman, American board game designer and developer
 Loren Wright (1917–2005), American professional basketball player

Women
 Loren Galler-Rabinowitz (born 1986), American ice dancer
 Loren Gray (born 2002), American singer and social media personality
 Loren Horsley (born 1977), New Zealand actress
 Loren Rowney (born 1988), Australian racing cyclist

Nickname
 Loren Legarda (born 1960), Filipina journalist and politician
 Loren Morón (footballer, born 1993), Spanish footballer
 Lorenzo Juarros García (born 1966), Spanish retired footballer
 Loren Morón (footballer, born 1970), Spanish footballer and manager
 Loren (born 1995), South Korean musician

Surname
 Donna Loren (born 1947), American actress
 Eric Loren, American actor
 Giselle Loren, American voice actor
 Josie Loren (born 1987), American actress
 Nanda Loren (born 1988), Brazilian singer
 Sophia Loren (born 1934), Italian actress
 Todd Loren (1960–1992), American comic book publisher

Fictional characters 
 Loren McWilliams, the male protagonist of the 1985 film The New Kids
 Loren Silvercloak, in the Fionavar Tapestry novels by Guy Gavriel Kay
Lt. Loren Singer, a main character in the TV series JAG
 Loren Smith (character), in the Dirk Pitt novels by Clive Cussler
 Loren, in the Animorphs novel series (appearing in The Andalite Chronicles and The Diversion)
 Frederick Loren, a character in the film House on Haunted Hill.

See also
Lauren (disambiguation)
Loran (disambiguation)
Lorens (given name)
Lorenz
Lorne (disambiguation)

English-language unisex given names
Lists of people by nickname